Parklands is a neighbourhood in the city of Nairobi, the capital and largest city in Kenya. It is divided into numbered avenues. The name arises from the proximity of the area to City Park, Nairobi.

Location
The coordinates of Parklands are:01 15 36S, 36 49 05E (Latitude:-1.2600; Longitude:36.8180).

Overview
During Kenya's colonial days, the British demarcated the area as a residential neighbourhood for civil servants. During the 1940s and 1950s Parklands was one of the most congested suburban areas of the Nairobi metropolitan area. In the second decade of the 2000s Parklands is a mixed commercial/residential neighbourhood. The relative availability and comparatively reasonably priced land in the area attracts business and residential real estate development, away from the relative lack and exorbitant pricing of real estate in Nairobi's central business district, to the south of Parklands. Parklands has a significant population of people of Asian descent.

Population
The population of Parklands is 38,344 as of 2009.

Education
When Ngara High School was founded in 1957, it served ethnic Indians of both sexes in Parklands and Ngara. Several Primary and Secondary Schools are in Parklands both government and private.

Landmarks
In Parklands, or near the boundaries of the neighbourhood, there are several landmarks, including the following:

 Aga Khan University Hospital, Nairobi
 Offices of Swiss International Air Lines
 Aga Khan Sports Centre
 Diamond Plaza
 City Park Market
 City Park Arena

Westlands division
Administratively, Parklands is a subdivision of the Westlands Administrative Division of the city of Nairobi. The division consists of the following six subdivisions (locations):
Parklands
Kitisuru
Highridge
Kangemi
Kilimani
Lavington

See also
 Westlands
 Highridge
 Upper Hill, Nairobi
 Nairobi
 Eastleigh, Nairobi

References

Populated places in Kenya
Cities in the Great Rift Valley
Suburbs of Nairobi